Leland Knoy Shaffer (May 9, 1912 – January 24, 1993) was an American football running back and quarterback for the New York Giants of the National Football League.

External links
NFL.com player page

1912 births
1993 deaths
People from Clark County, Kansas
American football running backs
Kansas State Wildcats football players
New York Giants players